Leukotriene A4 (LTA4) is a leukotriene, and is the precursor for the productions of LTB4 (leukotriene B)) and LTC4  (leukotriene C4).

Biosynthesis of Leukotriene A4 
Following the biosynthesis of eicosanoid, triggered as a result of infection or inflammation, the resulting arachidonic acid substrate is released from the cell membrane phospholipid will enter the lipooxygenase pathway to produce Leukotriene A4. In this pathway, arachidonic acid is converted into 5-hydroperoxyeicosatetraenoic acid (5-HPETE) as a result of a catalytic complex consisting of the enzyme 5-lipoxygenase (5-LO) and FLAP (5-Lipoxygenase-activating protein) in the presence of ATP and Calcium ions. The resulting 5-HPETE yields the unstable allylic epoxide substrate LTA4 which is quickly hydrolyzed by the LTA4H (Leukotriene A4 hydrolase) enzyme to produce LTB4, or synthesized by LTC4S (Leukotriene C4 synthase) with the addition of glutathione to produce LTC4 which can be further metabolized to produce LTD4 (Leukotriene D4) and LTE4 (Leukotriene E4). The lipooxygenase pathway is one of several possible pathways including the cyclooxygenase pathway (also PGH synthase pathway), isoprostane pathway, and cytochrome P450 epoxygenases pathway following the arachidonic acid metabolism, but is the only pathway in which the subsequent steps will lead to the production of leukotrienes.

References

Eicosanoids